Saman Nariman Jahan (Persian: سامان نریمان جهان) is an Iranian footballer who plays as a  winger for Naft Masjed Soleyman in the Persian Gulf pro league.

Club career

Gostaresh Foolad
He first started his senior career with Gostaresh in Azadegan League, he started his debut against Tarbiat Novin Yazd. He was a usually the starting eleven for Gostaresh, four weeks after his debut he scored a goal against Machine Sazi. He helped his team promote, he scored 4 of his goals for the club as a 21-year-old.

Tractor
After having a great reputation in Persian Gulf Pro League, Tractor decided to make an offer for him. Saman accepted the offer and joined Tractor in summer 2014. Saman was met to be the starter for Tractor in for the 2014–2015 Persian Gulf Pro League season.

On 10 May 2015, the second last match-day of the 2014–2015 Persian Gulf Pro League Nariman Jahan scored a hat-trick against Esteghlal at the Azadi Stadium in Tehran which kept Tractor at the top of the league with one match left.

Return to Gostaresh and Machine Sazi
In half of season 2015–2016, he returned to his previous football club Gostaresh and finished the season with this club. Nariman Jahan was mainly used as a substitute and scored one goal in 10 games. In June 2016 Nariman Jahan went on trial with Austrian Bundesliga club Wolfsberger AC. He did not join the team however due to financial issues.

Saman joined newly promoted team Machine Sazi before the start of the 2016–17 season. He scored in a draw against Esteghlal at the Azadi Stadium. He became known by fans as the Esteghlal Killer as this was his fourth career goal against Esteghlal.

Persepolis
On 4 January 2017 Nariman Jahan officially signed a -year contract with Persian Gulf Pro League leaders Persepolis. He was assigned the number 88 shirt. Nariman Jahan made his debut on 13 January 2017 in a match against Saipa at the Azadi Stadium.

Gostaresh Foolad 
After playing for Perspolis, He decided to go back and again signed a contract with Gostaresh Foolad.

Neftchi Baku 
On 10 January 2020, Nariman Jahan signed 1.5 years contract with Azerbaijan Premier League side Neftçi PFK. On 14 March 2021, Nariman Jahan left Neftçi by mutual consent.

Career statistics

International career
In October 2014, the Team Meli head coach Carlos Queiroz decided to call-up Saman for a training camp held in Portugal, however he did not play any games and it still uncapped at the international senior level.

Honours
Gostaresh Foolad
Azadegan League (1): 2012–13

Persepolis
Persian Gulf Pro League (1): 2016–17

References

 تراکتور فاتح دربی تبریز با گلزنی نریمان جهان و فخرالدینی Retrieved in Persian www.tasnimnews.com خبرگزاری تسنیم
گل اول تراکتور به ماشین سازی توسط نربمان جهان (ویدیو) Retrieved in Persian www.ilna.news خبرگزاری ایلنا
بازگشت سامان نریمان جهان به تبریز Retrieved in Persian www.mehrnews.com خبرگزاری مهر
نریمان‌جهان به تراکتور پیوست Retrieved in Persian www.farsnews.ir خبرگزاری فارس 
گل سامان به تیم سابق و اسبق! (عکس) Retrieved in Persian www.varzesh3.com   
نریمان جهان به تراکتور ملحق شد Retrieved in Persian www.irna.ir news خبرگزاری جمهوری اسلامی

External links
 Saman Nariman Jahan at persianlegue
 
 
 

1991 births
Living people
People from East Azerbaijan Province
Iranian footballers
Tractor S.C. players
Gostaresh Foulad F.C. players
Machine Sazi F.C. players
Naft Tehran F.C. players
Neftçi PFK players
Persian Gulf Pro League players
Azerbaijan Premier League players
Azadegan League players
Association football wingers